Thiruvananthapuram Parliamentary (Lok Sabha) Constituency is one of the 20 parliamentary constituencies in Kerala, India. It is located in Thiruvananthapuram district and encompasses the major part of Thiruvananthapuram city, the capital of Kerala State.

Demographics
As per the estimates of 2011 census, Thiruvananthapuram Parliament constituency has a population of 17,03,709 persons. Out of total population, 27.83% is rural and 72.17% is urban. The Scheduled castes (SC) and Scheduled tribes (ST) ratio is 9.82 and 0.45, respectively out of total population. As per the voter list published by the Election commission for the 2019 Lok Sabha elections, there are 13,34,665 voters in the electorate and 1077 polling stations in this constituency.

The total population of Thiruvananthapuram district is 33,01,427 as per census of 2011. Hindus constitute 66.46% of Thiruvananthapuram district population, Christians form 19.1% and Muslims constitute 13.72% of the total population.

Voter turnout for the 2019 Lok Sabha election was 73.45% where as it was 68.63% and 65.74% in the 2014 and 2009 elections respectively.

Assembly segments

Thiruvananthapuram Parliament constituency is composed of the following legislative assembly segments:

Members of Parliament

^ indicates bypolls

Election results
Percentage change (±%) denotes the change in the number of votes from the immediate previous election.

General Election 2019
There were 13,34,665 registered voters in Thiruvananthapuram Constituency for the 2019 Lok Sabha Election.  The Constituency recorded a polling percentage of 73.45% of the total electorate.

Party wise Results

Legislative Assembly wise Results

General Election 2014

Party wise Results

Legislative Assembly wise Results

General Election 2009

Bye-Election 2005

General Election 2004

General Election 1999

General Election 1998

General Election 1996

General Election 1991

General Election 1989

General Election 1984

General Election 1980

General Election 1977

General Election 1971

See also
 Indian general election, 2014 (Kerala)
 2014 Indian general election

References

External links
 Election Commission of India: https://web.archive.org/web/20081218010942/http://www.eci.gov.in/StatisticalReports/ElectionStatistics.asp
Thiruvananthapuram Lok Sabha Elections Asianet News survey results 2019

Lok Sabha constituencies in Kerala
Government of Thiruvananthapuram